The Malta women's national under-16 basketball team is a national basketball team of Malta, administered by the Malta Basketball Association. It represents the country in women's international under-16 basketball competitions.

The team won 5 medals at the FIBA U16 Women's European Championship Division C.

See also
Malta women's national basketball team
Malta women's national under-18 basketball team
Malta men's national under-16 basketball team

References

External links
Archived records of Malta team participations

Basketball in Malta
Women's national under-16 basketball teams
Basketball